Everything Goes!!! is an LP album by The Four Lads, released by Columbia Records as catalog number CS 8350 in 1960.

Track listing

The album was reissued, combined with the 1959 album Swing Along, on CD by Collectables Records on July 31, 2001.

The Four Lads albums
Columbia Records albums
1960 albums